In tennis, the ninth edition of the US Open Series (known as Emirates Airline US Open Series for sponsorships reasons), included twelve hard court tournaments that started on July 9, 2012 in Stanford and concluded in Winston-Salem for the men and in New Haven for the women on August 26, 2012. This edition scheduled four separate men's tournaments and four women's tournaments – the Citi Open and the Western & Southern Open hosted both a men's and women's event. The series was headlined by two ATP World Tour Masters 1000 and two WTA Premier 5 events. The series winners were Novak Djokovic and Petra Kvitová.

Point distribution for series events 

In order to be included in the standings and subsequently the bonus prize money, a player needed to have countable results from two different tournaments. Players who finished in the top three in the series could have earned up to $1 million in extra prize money at the US Open. Roger Federer received the largest US Open pay day of $2.4 million in 2007 after capturing the title in both the US Open Series and the US Open championship.

US Open Series standings 

The final standings below include all players who received points in at least two tournaments.

ATP 

 as of August 25, 2012

Notes:
 1 – Tours – Number of tournaments in US Open Series in which a player has reached the quarterfinals or better, in 250 and 500 series events or the Round of 16 in ATP World Tour Masters 1000 events.

WTA 

 as of August 25, 2012

Notes:
 1 – Tours – Number of tournaments in US Open Series in which a player has reached the quarterfinals or better, in Premier events; or the Round of 16 or better in Premier 5 events.

Bonus Prize Money 
The US Open series gives bonus money to the top three player in the US Open Series, depending on where they finish in the 2012 US Open (tennis) and where they finish in 2012 US Open Series. The bonus money they receive is

2012 schedule

Week 1

WTA – Bank of the West Classic 

The defending champion, Serena Williams, and last year's finalist, Marion Bartoli, headlined the event. Playing just in the week after her victories in singles and doubles at Wimbledon, Williams advanced to her fourth final of the season conceding just ten games in total. In the other side of the draw, young American, Coco Vandeweghe, who entered the main draw as a lucky-loser, made an impressive run to the final defeating Jelena Janković and Yanina Wickmayer en route. The final was the first all-American final in the WTA Tour since 2009 WTA Tour Championships, and the first on U.S. soil since the Los Angeles in 2004. In the final, Williams successfully defended her title after defeating Vandeweghe 7–5, 6–3.

Main draw finals

Week 2

ATP – BB&T Atlanta Open 

The three highest-ranked American, John Isner, Mardy Fish, and Andy Roddick headlined the event. Roddick advanced to his second final appearance of the season after a close-fight semifinals encounter against Isner, in which he won in three sets. Gilles Müller of Luxembourg, who was trailing 4–6, 2–3 in his second round match against Fish before Fish retired, advanced to his third ATP final appearance in his career. In the final, Roddick claimed his 32nd career title after defeating Müller 1–6, 7–6(7–2), 6–2.

Main draw finals

WTA – Mercury Insurance Open 

Marion Bartoli, Dominika Cibulková, and Jelena Janković headlined the event. As a qualifier, Chan Yung-jan upset the third seeded Janković in three tight sets in the quarterfinals which lasted for more than three hours with score 6–7(4–7),7–6(10–8), 7–5. First seeded Bartoli battled her way to the final by winning all her three matches en route in three sets. Second seeded Cibulková cruised to the final as well, setting up for the fourth time in 2012 where the first seed met the second seed in the final of a WTA tournament. Cibulková went on to win the title in straight sets, after defeating Bartoli 6–1, 7–5.

Main draw finals

Week 3

ATP – Farmers Classic 

Benoît Paire, Sam Querrey, Leonardo Mayer, and Nicolas Mahut headlined the event. Coming from the qualifying stage of the tournament, Ričardas Berankis reached the final after taking down the fourth-seeded Mahut and sixth-seeded Marinko Matosevic in the quarterfinals and semifinals respectively. Having won the tournament twice in 2009 and 2010, Querrey cruised through to his first final appearance since winning the title in 2010. He went on crushing Berankis 6–0, 6–2 for his seventh singles title.

Main draw finals

Week 4

ATP – Citi Open 

Being held concurrently with the 2012 Summer Olympics, the event was headlined by Mardy Fish, Alexandr Dolgopolov, Kevin Anderson, Tommy Haas, and Los Angeles champion, Sam Querrey. Third-seeded Haas reached his third final appearance of the season after defeating top-seeded Fish in the semifinals in straight sets. Second-seeded Dolgopolov also reached the final after beating Querrey in the semifinals as well. Dolgopolov ended up winning his second career title after defeating Haas 6–7(7–9), 6–4, 6–1 in the final.

Main draw finals

WTA – Citi Open 

Being held in the same week as the Summer Olympics, the event was headlined by players who missed the Olympics' qualification. The pack of players was led by first seeded Anastasia Pavlyuchenkova, second seeded Chanelle Scheepers, and third seeded Sloane Stephens. As an unseeded player, Magdaléna Rybáriková defeated these top three seeds to win her third WTA title after defeating Pavlyuchenkova 6–1, 6–1 in the final.

As an International level tournament, the event did not award any points toward the US Open Series standings.

Main draw finals

Week 5

ATP – Rogers Cup (Toronto) 

Seven of the world top 10 players headlined the event, with world no.2 and defending champion, Novak Djokovic, recent Olympics gold medalist, Andy Murray led the pack. Just one week after his loss at the Olympics, Djokovic reached his sixth final appearance of the season. Murray withdrew in the third round due to knee injury. Fourteenth-seeded Richard Gasquet beat the likes of fourth-seeded Tomáš Berdych and the top two American players, Mardy Fish and John Isner, to advance to his second final appearance of the season. Djokovic won the final comfortably by 6–3, 6–2 to earn his third title of the season.

Main draw finals

WTA – Rogers Cup (Montreal) 

Nine of the world top 10 players headlined the event, with Victoria Azarenka, Agnieszka Radwańska, and Maria Sharapova led the field. Radwańska had a chance to become the world no.1 after the conclusion of the tournament. The event's schedule was heavily disturbed with rain, causing the final to be played on Monday, August 13. World no. 6, Petra Kvitová advanced to her first final appearance of the season after defeating Caroline Wozniacki in the semifinals. In the other side of the draw, Li Na erased Radwańska's chance of overtaking the world no.1 title after defeating her in the quarterfinals. Li eventually advanced to the final after defeating Lucie Šafářová in a tightly-contested semifinals, having to trail from 1–5 in the third set. Kvitová ended up winning the title after defeating Li 7–5, 2–6, 6–3 in the Monday final, for her first title in 2012.

Main draw finals

Week 6

ATP – Western & Southern Open 

Eight of the world top 10 players entered the tournament, with the pack headlined by three of the top four players: world no.1, Roger Federer, reigning US Open Champion, Novak Djokovic, and the defending champion, Andy Murray. Playing in his first tournament since the final of the Olympics, Federer reached the final of the tournament which ensured his position as the no.1 seed in the upcoming US Open. Murray lost in the third round to lucky loser, Jérémy Chardy and Djokovic advanced to the final from the opposite half of the draw after defeating Juan Martín del Potro in the semifinals. Federer ended up winning his 76th title after defeating Djokovic 6–0, 7–6(9–7).

Main draw finals

WTA – Western & Southern Open 

Eight of the world top 10 players entered the tournament, with the pack led by Serena Williams, Agnieszka Radwańska, and recent Montreal champion, Petra Kvitová. Williams' older sister, Venus Williams, who entered the tournament with a wild card, had a breakthrough week where she reached her first semifinals appearance since the 2010 US Open after displaying some of her vintage form when defeating Sara Errani and Samantha Stosur. Montreal runner-up, Li Na, defeated Radwańska and Venus Williams to advance to her second consecutive final appearance. In the bottom half of the draw, Angelique Kerber defeated Serena Williams and Kvitová to reach her fourth final appearance of the year, bidding for the biggest title of her career. Li started slowly in the final before regrouping and won her sixth career title after defeating Kerber 1–6, 6–4, 6–1.

Main draw finals

Week 7

ATP – Winston-Salem Open 

Jo-Wilfried Tsonga, Tomáš Berdych, and the defending champion, John Isner, headlined the event. Tsonga and Isner faced each other in the semifinals where Isner won through a third-set tiebreak. Berdych also advanced to the final for his third final appearance of the season. Isner successfully defended his title after defeating Berdych in a close-fought final by 3–6, 6–4, 7–6(11–9), thus clinching his second singles title of the season and fifth overall.

Main draw finals

WTA – New Haven Open at Yale 

Agnieszka Radwańska, Petra Kvitová, and the defending champion, Caroline Wozniacki headlined the event. Wozniacki was bidding for her fifth straight title at the event. However, she had to retire in her semifinals match due to a nagging knee injury. Radwańska also retired in the second round due to a nagging shoulder injury. Seventh seeded Maria Kirilenko advanced to the final for her second final appearance of the season where she would face Kvitová who cruised comfortably to the final. By winning her quarterfinals match, Kvitová clinched the US Open Series title. Eventually, Kvitová won the final 7–6(11–9), 7–5 for her second title of the year.

Main draw finals

References

External links